Lionel Arthur Weerasinghe was the 29th Auditor General of Ceylon. He was appointed on 2 March 1953, succeeding E. Allen Smith, and held the office until 14 September 1963. He was succeeded by D. S. De Silva.

References

Auditors General of Sri Lanka